La Guajira may refer to:
 La Guajira Peninsula, a peninsula in the northernmost part of South America shared by Colombia and Venezuela
 La Guajira Department, a department of Colombia which includes most of the Guajira Peninsula
 La Guajira Desert, a desert which covers most of  the Guajira Peninsula